Zombie Driver is a vehicular combat video game. Set in a zombie apocalypse environment, a chemical accident/secret government project has turned the inhabitants of a city into shambling, aggressive opponents. The player must undertake various missions to rescue stranded civilians, slaughter zombies and unlock/upgrade various vehicles.

It was later released as Zombie Driver HD on the Xbox 360, PlayStation 3 and Ouya game consoles and Steam, and on Xbox One as Zombie Driver: Ultimate Edition. A Nintendo Switch version was released as Zombie Driver: Immortal Edition. A PlayStation 4 version of the same name was released on August 14, 2020.

Reception

External links

Automotive Zombiefest 'Zombie Driver' Announced

2009 video games
Android (operating system) games
PlayStation 3 games
PlayStation Network games
Vehicular combat games
Video games developed in Poland
Windows games
Xbox 360 Live Arcade games
Xbox One games
Video games about zombies
Ouya games